Acleris aestuosa is a species of moth of the family Tortricidae. It is found in Japan (Shikoku).

The wingspan is 18–21 mm.

The larvae feed on Fagus crenata.

References

Moths described in 1965
aestuosa
Moths of Japan